Bengt Nåjde (born Carlsson on 19 May 1942) is a retired Swedish long-distance runner. He competed in the 5,000 m at the 1964 Summer Olympics, but failed to reach the final. He later placed sixth-eighth in this event at the European championships in 1966 and 1969.

References

1942 births
Living people
Athletes (track and field) at the 1964 Summer Olympics
Olympic athletes of Sweden
Swedish male long-distance runners
People from Ludvika Municipality
Sportspeople from Dalarna County